M. tigris may refer to:
 Maniho tigris, a spider species in the genus Maniho
 Microlophus tigris, a lizard species in the genus Microlophus
 Mycteroperca tigris, a fish species

See also
 Tigris (disambiguation)